Unholy Partners is a 1941 black-and-white film directed by Mervyn LeRoy and starring Edward G. Robinson, Laraine Day, Edward Arnold, and Marsha Hunt. It was released by Metro-Goldwyn-Mayer.

Plot 
A newspaper reporter, Bruce Corey, returns from World War I to New York City. After reporting to his job at his old newspaper, Corey finds that his old editor doesn't like his new ideas.

Corey and his war correspondent friends start their own down-market newspaper which will feature "the news before it happens." Corey gambles with a mob boss and wins the money to start up his paper, the New York Mercury, an instant success.

However, because of stories that may implicate the newspaper's silent partner in a number of crimes, Corey finds himself and his staff threatened and even the targets of gunfire. Corey finally kills the mob boss and flees the country on a plane that is attempting a trans-Atlantic flight. The plane crashes and he is killed. Rather than embroil the paper in the murder investigation, Corey embarks on what he knows is an extremely dangerous flight. The plane does crash mid-ocean at the end he is reported to have swum away from a rescue craft.

Cast
Edward G. Robinson as Bruce Corey
Edward Arnold as Merrill Lambert
Laraine Day as Miss Cronin
Marsha Hunt as Gail Fenton
William T. Orr as Thomas Jarvis
Don Beddoe as Michael Reynolds
Emory Parnell as Col. Mason

External links 
 

1941 films
American black-and-white films
1941 crime drama films
Films about journalists
Films directed by Mervyn LeRoy
1941 romantic drama films
Metro-Goldwyn-Mayer films
American crime drama films
American romantic drama films
1940s English-language films
1940s American films